KCGY (95.1 FM) is a radio station broadcasting a country music format. Licensed to Laramie, Wyoming, United States, the station serves Laramie and nearby Cheyenne. The station is currently owned by Townsquare Media and features programming from Westwood One.

The station is the FM flagship for Wyoming Cowboys football and basketball; games are simulcast with sister station KOWB.

KCGY FM was originally put on the air by Curt Gowdy (from whom it takes its call letters), a Wyoming native who gained fame as a sportscaster for major TV networks.

History
KCGY first signed on the air in 1983 with its current country music format.

References

External links 
Official Website

CGY
Country radio stations in the United States
Radio stations established in 1983
1983 establishments in Wyoming
Townsquare Media radio stations